Terellia uncinata is a species of tephritid or fruit flies in the genus Terellia of the family Tephritidae.

Distribution
Italy, Albania, Bulgaria, Greece, Turkey.

References

Tephritinae
Insects described in 1989
Diptera of Europe